, also called Hikarian: Great Railroad Protector, is a Japanese anime and toy franchise by Tomy.

The first television series, is about a series of bullet trains that are turned into robots. The robots, along with two humans named Tetsuyuki Shinbashi (新橋 テツユキ Shinbashi Tetsuyuki) and Minayo Kanda (神田 ミナヨ Kanda Minayo), have to stop an alien invasion. Some of the OVAs even appeared after Tomica VHS tapes.

A second television series, was later created. The new series stars a new Hikarian, Lightning West, and a new human lead, Kenta Hijiribashi (聖橋 ケンタ Hijiribashi Kenta).

Enoki Films has licensed the series for an English release. The company has suggested name changes (e.g. Tetsuyuki becomes Terry and Minayo becomes Mina), but the series is not yet available in English, and Enoki may sublicense the series to another company who may decide to keep the original Japanese names, use Enoki's suggested English names, or use original English names.

Characters
The main characters in Hikarian are the Hikarians who fight against the Blatcher gang and their plan operation Darkness.
All of the characters, except the Black Express, are based on real life trains.  The series depicts them operating as normal trains during times of peace.

Hikarians 
 Nozomi: The most dynamic hero of the entire Hikarian members. He is full of fighting spirit. He uses a shield and sword.
 Tsubasa: He is very sharp and agile even in narrow places or on highlands.
 Max: The biggest Hikarian. He has strong muscles and uses a huge hammer.
 Hikari: The Captain of Hikarians. Always resourceful and calm.
 Windash: She is a test car called "Win 350." She possesses the power to see the future.
 E2 Jet: He flies at tremendous speed. He scrambles to rescue friends like fighter planes. He uses turbine lasers that pack a punch.
 Police-Win: Patrol Train of the Railroad Police. He uses a laser that helps him in sticky situations.
 Fire N'ex: Fire Engine of the Railroad.
 Sniper Sonic: Defense Force of railroad. He has a big cannon.
 Dr. 300X: A test car. He is a very intelligent scientist and invents special cars.
 Nankai Lapito: A ninja Hikarian. He uses a ninja sword with a shuriken shield. His attacks are super fast and ninja style.
 Azusa: The rescue car of the railroad.
 Lighting West: A most advanced super express. She runs on rails at the highest speed in the world. The wing sensor on her back gives her the power to search the time tunnel.  Main character of the second series. Can combine with Sky Garuda to form Lightning Garuda.
 Doctor Yellow: An engineer of Hikarian Headquarters. He assists Dr. 300X.
 E3 Racer: Unlike other Hikarians he has got wheels on feet. E2 Jet's friend.
 E4 Power: Max's friend. Loves to clean with his broom used also as weapon.
 Yamabiko
 K-kun: Youngest of the Hikarians.
 Kodama: Oldest of the Hikarians.
 STAR21: Experimental engineer
 Seven
 Eurostar Blue Euro: Eurostar only appears in the series twice. After one fight, he is so badly damaged that he has to undergo a treatment that will eventually become the Blue Euro. (The treatment was in the background so only the creators knew how it was).
 Hitachi Brothers: There are four in total.
 Odakyū Romancecar
 Skyliner
 Rescue: American Hikarian Road Fire Engine.
 Hikarian X/Shadow X: Combines with Sphinx and Nazca to form God X.

Humans 
 Tetsuyuki Shinbashi (新橋 テツユキ Shinbashi Tetsuyuki) / Terry : Friends with the Hikarians and a lover of trains.
 Minayo Kanda (神田 ミナヨ Kanda Minayo) / Mina : Terry's girlfriend.

Blatcher Gang 
 Black Express: The boss of the Blatcher Gang. He uses an electric maces and most times hides in black smoke.
 Dozilas: The henchmen of Black Express. They have a mild heart and like to play with children.
 Wookary: A careless and daydreaming guy.
 Silver Express Mastermind of the Blatcher Gang.
 Smoke Jo: The gigantic locomotive made by the Blatchers. When it passes by, everything will turn totally black.
 Baron Euro
 Star: Black Express' daughter (probably)
Ukkari: The Streamlined locomotive that does the budget cuts.

Chinese CGI knockoff
In January 2011, it was announced Pat Lee would be working with Carloon Animation to create a CGI cartoon about trains called  (高铁侠). In July 2011, Chinese viewers of previews were shocked that it was a shot-for-shot knockoff of Hikarian.  After Pat Lee was sued by TV Tokyo & Takara Tomy when they found out about the cartoon being a rip-off of Hikarian, Pat Lee created a revised version called Train Heroes (トレインヒーロー) which began airing in Japan in April 2013.

References

External links
 Toho Amusement Park Hikarian website 
 
  - Enoki Films USA

1996 anime OVAs
1997 anime television series debuts
2002 anime television series debuts
Mecha anime and manga
TV Tokyo original programming
Takara Tomy franchises